The Latvia International or Latvia Riga International is an international badminton tournament held in Latvia since 2005.

Previous winners

Performances by nation

References

Badminton tournaments
Badminton tournaments in Latvia
Sports competitions in Latvia